Shane Duffy is a Gaelic footballer who plays for the Ratoath club and, previously, at senior level for the Monaghan county team. He was a very important figure in Magheracloone Mitchell's capture of the Monaghan Senior Football Championship in 2004, Ratoath's capture of the Meath and Leinster Intermediate Championship titles in 2015, and in Monaghan's 2005 National Football League Division 2 title.

Duffy is an experienced goalkeeper, although he was not always able to hold on to a starting place in the Monaghan team, with competition from players such as Glen Murphy.

Duffy won the 2011 All-Ireland Kick Fada Championship with a 60-metre kick into a strong headwind.

References

External links
 Shane Duffy interview
 Monaghan on Hoganstand.com
 Monaghan GAA site

Year of birth missing (living people)
Living people
Gaelic football goalkeepers
Magheracloone Gaelic footballers
Monaghan inter-county Gaelic footballers